Nakhon Ratchasima (often called Khorat) (alternate spelling Korat) is one of Thailand's seventy-six provinces (changwat) lies in lower northeastern Thailand also called Isan. It is the country's second largest province by area, has a population of approximately 2.7 million, and generates about 250 billion baht in GDP, the highest in Isan. Neighbouring provinces are (clockwise, from north) Chaiyaphum, Khon Kaen, Buriram, Sa Kaeo, Prachinburi, Nakhon Nayok, Saraburi, and Lopburi.

The capital of the province is the city of Nakhon Ratchasima in Mueang Nakhon Ratchasima district, also called Khorat.

Geography

The province is at the west end of the Khorat Plateau, separated from the Chao Phraya river valley by the Phetchabun and Dong Phaya Yen mountain ranges. Two national parks are in the province: Khao Yai in the west and Thap Lan in the south. Both parks are in the forested mountains of the Sankamphaeng Range, the southern prolongation of the Dong Phaya Yen mountains.

Nakhon Ratchasima is a large province on the northeastern plateau and acts as a gateway to other provinces in the northeast. The province is rich in Khmer culture and has a long history.

National parks
There are two national parks, along with two other national parks, make up region 1 (Prachinburi) of Thailand's protected areas. 
 Thap Lan National Park, 
 Khao Yai National Park,

History

The area around Khorat was already an important centre in the times of the Khmer empire in the 11th century, as can be seen by the temple ruins in Phimai historical park. Nakhon Ratchasima province is one of the provinces where there is still a sizable northern Khmer population.

A new walled city with a surrounding moat, designated as Nakhon Ratchasima, was built in the 17th century by order of the King Narai, as the easternmost "command post", guarding the kingdom's border. Nakhon Ratchasima continued this duty during the Bangkok Period, although it was briefly seized during Lao rebellion (1826–1828) in 1826, in the reign of King Rama III of Siam. 

Nakhon Ratchasima has long been the most important political and economic centre in the northeastern region. In the late-19th century, the railroad reached Khorat and it became the junction of two main rail lines in the northeastern, Isan, region. In 1933, Nakhon Ratchasima was the stronghold of the royalist troops in the Boworadet Rebellion, as they fought against the new democratic government in Bangkok. In the 1950s, the Korat Royal Thai Air Force Base was built in Nakhon Ratchasima; from 1961 until 26 February 1976, this facility was also used as a base by the United States Air Force.

A mass shooting occurred in the province on 8 and 9 February 2020. The gunman killed 30 and wounded another 57 before being shot dead by police. It was the deadliest mass shooting in Thailand's history.

Nakhon Ratchasima was the birthplace of Thao Suranari who was born in 1771 and was the savior of Nakhon Ratchasima from King Chao Anouvong's army in 1826.

Symbols

The provincial seal depicts the revered heroine of Khorat, Thao Suranari (Thai: ท้าวสุรนารี).

A monument to Thao Suranari (real name: Khunying Mo; 1771–1852) stands in front of the old Pratu Chumphon gate. Also called "The Great Heroine of Khorat", Kunying Mo was the wife of the Siamese-appointed deputy governor of Nakhon Ratchasima during the reign of King Rama III. In 1826, Khunying Mo managed to repel the Laotian army led by Prince Anouvong of Vientiane who tried to reinstate control over the Khorat plateau. King Rama III conferred the title of Thao Suranari on Khunying Mo, as well as additional ones honouring her bravery.

The provincial tree and flower is the sathon (Millettia leucantha).

The provincial motto is "Land of brave women, fine silk material, Khorat rice noodles, Phimai Historical Park, and Dan Kwian ceramics".

The provincial color is orange

Administrative divisions

Provincial government

The province is divided into 32 districts (amphoes). The districts are further subdivided into 263 sub-districts (tambons) and 3,743 villages (mubans).

Mueang Nakhon Ratchasima
Khon Buri
Soeng Sang
Khong
Ban Lueam
Chakkarat
Chok Chai
Dan Khun Thot
Non Thai
Non Sung
Kham Sakaesaeng
Bua Yai
Prathai
Pak Thong Chai
Phimai
Huai Thalaeng
Chum Phuang
Sung Noen
Kham Thale So
Sikhio
Pak Chong
Nong Bun Mak
Kaeng Sanam Nang
Non Daeng
Wang Nam Khiao
Thepharak
Mueang Yang
Phra Thong Kham
Lam Thamenchai
Bua Lai
Sida
Chaloem Phra Kiat

Local government

As of 26 November 2019 there are: one Nakhon Ratchasima Provincial Administration Organisation and 90 municipal (thesaban) areas in the province. Nakhon Ratchasima municipality has city (thesaban nakhon) status. Bua Yai, Mueang Pak, Pak Chong and Sikhio municipalities have town (thesaban mueang) status. Further 85 subdistrict municipalities (thesaban tambon).The non-municipal areas are administered by 243 Subdistrict Administrative Organisations - SAO (ongkan borihan suan tambon).

Economy

Khorat's economy has traditionally been heavily dependent on agriculture. It is known as a processing centre for Isan's production of rice, tapioca, and sugar. The Isan region accounts for half of Thailand's exports of those commodities. Khorat is also one of two sites in Thailand manufacturing disk drives by Seagate Technology, employing 12,100 workers in Khorat.

Transport 
Air
Nakhon Ratchasima has Nakhon Ratchasima Airport, but it has no scheduled flights. The nearest working airport is in Buriram and has flights to and from Bangkok.

Rail
The railway system in Nakhon Ratchasima is on both northeastern routes from Bangkok Railway Station. Nakhon Ratchasima province has eight main railway stations. In 2017, a 60-kilometre dual-track line will connect Korat to Khon Kaen province. It is the first segment of a dual track network that will connect Isan with the Laem Chabang seaport. Mueang District is served by two stations: Nakhon Ratchasima railway station and Thanon Chira Junction railway station.

Road
Highway 2 (Mittraphap Road) is the main route that connects nine districts in Nakhon Ratchasima including Muang district. This route also connects Nakhon Ratchasima to Saraburi and Khon Kaen provinces. Hwy 24 links Si Khio District from Hwy 2 to Pak Thongcha, Chok Chai, and Nong Bunnak Districts and to Buriram province. A new motorway connecting Khorat to Bangkok is under construction in 2016 and will reduce travel time on the 250 kilometre journey to just over two hours.

Health 
Nakhon Ratchasima has hospitals in mostly the public sector, but some in the private sector. Its main hospital is Maharat Nakhon Ratchasima Hospital, which is one of the main hospitals for the Praboromarajchanok Medicine Program of Mahidol University. The province also has a university hospital, which is Suranaree University of Technology Hospital of the Institute of Medicine, Suranaree University of Technology.

Sports 
Football

Nakhon Ratchasima F.C. play in Thai League 1 top tier of Thailand football league. Despite the city of Korat having a population in excess of 400,000 and Nakhon Ratchasima province having a population in excess of 2.5 million, Nakhon Ratchasima F.C. struggled to attract more than 400 for most home games throughout their history, the club play in the 80th Birthday Stadium.

Volleyball
Nakhon Ratchasima is the home of the four-times Men's Volleyball Thailand League winner, Nakhon Ratchasima the Mall and the three-times Women's Volleyball Thailand League winner, Nakhon Ratchasima the Mall.

Education

Universities
There are four universities in the area.
Nakhon Ratchasima Rajabhat University
Rajamangala University of Technology Isan
Suranaree University of Technology
Vongchavalitkul University

Schools
 Ratchasima Wittayalai School
 Saint Mary's College Nakhon Ratchasima
 Suranaree Wittaya School
 MBAC
 Boonwatthana
 Phimai Witthaya
 Assumption School Nakhon Ratchasima
 Fort Surathamphithak School
 Phoowittaya School (lab school project)
 Plookpanya School
 Koratpittayakom school
 Wangrongnoi school
 Phatongkhamwittaya school 
 Surawiwat school in Suranaree University of Technology
International schools
 St Stephen's International School (SIS) (Khao Yai Campus)
 Adventists International Mission School (AIMS) (Nakhon Ratchasima Campus)
 Anglo Singapore International School (Korat Campus)
 Wesley International School

Notable people

Born in Nakhon Ratchasima 
 Prachya Pinkaew (Thai:ปรัชญา ปิ่นแก้ว) (born 1962), film director of Ong-Bak: Muay Thai Warrior and Tom-Yum-Goong, both martial arts films starring Tony Jaa.
 Kiattipong Radchatagriengkai (Thai:เกียรติพงษ์ รัชตเกรียงไกร) (born 1966),  former head coach of the Thailand women's national volleyball team
 Luang Por Khun Parissuddho (Thai:พระเทพวิทยาคม) (born 1923), buddhist monk
 Ratanapol Sor Vorapin (Thai:รัตนพล ส.วรพิน) (born 1974), professional boxer
 Prayut Chan-o-cha (Thai:ประยุทธ์ จันทร์โอชา) (born 1954), politician
 Sunaree Ratchasima (Thai:สุนารี ราชสีมา) (born 1968), luk thung female singer
 Jakrapun Kornburiteerachote (Thai:จักรพันธ์ ครบุรีธีรโชติ) (born 1968), luk thung singer, actor
 Seksan Sukpimai (Thai:เสกสรรค์ ศุขพิมาย) (born 1974), singer, songwriter, guitarist 
 Phongthep Kradonchamnan (Thai:พงษ์เทพ กระโดนชำนาญ) (born 1953), singer, songwriter, musician, poet

Communications
Landlines provided by TOT and TT&T
IDD phones provided by CAT
Mobiles provided by AIS GSM, DTAC, TRUE, and HUTCH
Internet / High-speed internet (ADSL) provided by TOT, CAT, and TT&T.

Attractions 

Phimai Historical Park is one of the most important Khmer temples of Thailand. It is in the town of Phimai. The temple marks one end of the ancient Khmer Highway from Angkor. As the enclosed area of 1020 x 580 metres is comparable to that of Angkor Wat, Phimai must have been an important city in the Khmer Empire. Most buildings date from the late-11th to the late-12th century, built in the Baphuon, Bayon, and Angkor Wat styles. However, even though the Khmer at that time were Hindu, the temple was built as a Buddhist temple, since the inhabitants of the Khorat area had been Buddhists as far back the 7th century. Inscriptions name the site Vimayapura, which developed into the Thai name Phimai.
Khao Yai National Park is in the western part of the Sankamphaeng Mountain Range, at the southwestern boundary of the Khorat Plateau. The highest mountain in the area of the park is 1,351 m high Khao Rom. This park lies largely in Nakhon Ratchasima province (Khorat), but also includes parts of Saraburi, Prachinburi, and Nakhon Nayok provinces. The park is the third largest in Thailand. It covers an area of 300 square kilometers, including tropical seasonal forests and grasslands. Elevations mostly range from 400 to 1,000 m. It is home to 3,000 species of plants and 320 species of birds. Waterfalls include the 80 metre Heo Narok, and Heo Suwat .

Nakhon Ratchasima railway station is a 1st class station and the main railway station in the province. There are 18 daily trains serving this station. There are four to six special trains during the celebration of the New Year and Songkran.
Lam Takhong Dam is an embankment dam on the Lam Takhong River between Pak Chong District and Sikhio District. The dam was constructed in 1974 for the purposes of irrigation and water supply, but after 2002 its water storage also serves as the lower reservoir for the Lam Takhong pumped storage power plant, Thailand's first power plant of this type.
Korat's zoo was established under the patronage of the king. The zoo is managed by the Ministry of Natural Resources and Environment (Thailand). The Korat Zoo has rare animals such as tigers, giraffes, lions, elephants, zebras, rhinoceroses, hedgehogs, birds such as guinea fowls, ostriches, and flamingos.
Khao Yai Thiang is the mountain located in Khlong Phai, Pak Chong District. There are 12 wind turbines on top of the mountain. Tourist can go cycling and enjoying the view of reservoir.

Korat cat

()

The Korat cat is a natural breed, and one of the oldest stable cat breeds. Originating in Nakhon Ratchasima province at Phimai, it is named after its province of origin. In Thailand the breed is known as si sawat, meaning "colour of the sawat seed" (bluish-gray). Korat cats are distinguished not only by the colour of their fur. Genuine Korat cats have a heart-shaped face when viewed from any angle and shorter grey hair with silver tips. The true breed's eyes are yellow with an inner green circle. They must be slender and agile. The cat's tail must be slender. Cats with crooked tails are considered inauspicious.

In 1965, Korat cats were first registered in the US by the Korat Cat Fanciers Association. The cats that formed the breed were first imported from Thailand by Jean L. Johnson in 1959. In 1966 the breed was accepted by the Cat Fanciers' Association (CFA). The Korat breed is now accepted by cat associations around the world.

The International Maew Boran Association (TIMBA) ("maew boran" means "ancient cat") was formed in Thailand to provide a registry of and pedigrees for Thai cats, including Korats,  and to provide a voice in English for Thai breeders as "...Thai breeders...do not speak English, and farang breeders do not speak Thai.".

Sister cities
 Harare, Zimbabwe

See also
Human achievement index (HAI), by National Economic and Social Development Board

References

External links

Province page from the Tourist Authority of Thailand
Nakhon Ratchasima Travel Guide

Official website
Nakhon Ratchasima provincial map, coat of arms and postal stamp 
Khao Yai National Park

 
Isan
Provinces of Thailand

km:នគររាជសីមា